Raymond Bonal  (1600–1653) was a founder of the Congregation of the Priests of St. Mary (Bonalists), a French order active in the sixteenth and seventeenth centuries.

References

1600 births
1653 deaths
17th-century French Roman Catholic priests